Animal Planet is a Canadian English language discretionary specialty television channel. Animal Planet broadcasts a variety of programming featuring animals.

The channel is owned by the Animal Planet Canada Company, which is a consortium consisting of CTV Speciality Television Inc. which owns 80% of the company (CTV Speciality Television Inc. is a division of Bell Media who owns 70% and ESPN owning 30%), and Canadian AP Ventures Company who owns 20% (Canadian AP Ventures Company is owned by BBC Studios at 50% and Warner Bros. Discovery at 50%). Through this ownership structure, this effectively gives Bell Media 56% ownership and control, with ESPN 24%, BBC Studios 10%, and Warner Bros. Discovery 10% ownership.

History
In November 2000, CTV Inc. was granted approval by the Canadian Radio-television and Telecommunications Commission (CRTC) to launch Animal Planet, a service described as being "broadly based on family entertainment that will combine high-quality Canadian programming and attractive series and documentaries from Animal Planet in the United States."

The channel was launched under its current ownership structure (with the exception of Bell Media, wherein Bell Globemedia, later renamed CTVglobemedia, owned its shares at the time) on September 7, 2001.

On June 30, 2008, Animal Planet unveiled a new on-air appearance, including a new logo and graphics, to align itself with the American service which had updated its appearance earlier that year.

On September 10, 2010, BCE (a minority shareholder in CTVglobemedia) announced that it planned to acquire 100% interest in CTVglobemedia for a total debt and equity transaction cost of $3.2 billion CAD. The deal which required CRTC approval, was approved on March 7, 2011 and closed on April 1 of that year, on which CTVglobemedia was rebranded Bell Media.

Animal Planet HD
On June 17, 2011, Bell Media announced that it would launch Animal Planet HD, a high definition (HD) simulcast of the standard definition feed, by the end of 2011. The channel launched on December 15, 2011, initially on Bell Fibe TV and Shaw Cable and launched at a later date on Telus TV. About six years later, Shaw Direct added it and 5 other HD channels (Business News Network, Cooking Channel, Crime & Investigation, OWN, and Travel + Escape) to the channel listing on September 21, 2017.

Logos

References

External links 
 

Digital cable television networks in Canada
Bell Media networks
English-language television stations in Canada
Television channels and stations established in 2001
2001 establishments in Canada